St Bartholomew’s Church, Kneesall is a Grade I listed Church of England parish in the Diocese of Southwell and Nottingham in Kneesall.

History

The church dates from the 14th century. It was restored in 1846 and 1860, then in 1893 by Charles Hodgson Fowler.

It is in a group of parishes comprising:
St Swithin’s Church, Wellow
St Michael the Archangel's Church, Laxton
Moorhouse Chantry Chapel

Organ

The church has an organ by Brindley & Foster. A specification of the organ can be found on the National Pipe Organ Register.

References

Grade I listed churches in Nottinghamshire
Church of England church buildings in Nottinghamshire
14th-century church buildings in England